Gillis is an unincorporated community and census-designated place (CDP) in northern Calcasieu Parish, Louisiana, United States. As of the 2010 census it had a population of 657.

Geography
U.S. Route 171 is the main road through the community.

Gillis falls under the school district of Iowa, a town  to the southeast, though most parents send their children to schools much closer to home. Students who live in the Gillis community may attend Gillis Elementary on Topsy Road and Moss Bluff Middle School and Sam Houston High School in Moss Bluff.

Demographics

References

Census-designated places in Louisiana
Census-designated places in Calcasieu Parish, Louisiana
Census-designated places in Lake Charles metropolitan area